Ruschberg is an Ortsgemeinde – a municipality belonging to a Verbandsgemeinde, a kind of collective municipality – in the Birkenfeld district in Rhineland-Palatinate, Germany. It belongs to the Verbandsgemeinde of Baumholder, whose seat is in the like-named town.

Geography

Location
Ruschberg lies on the Baumholder Bach southwest of the 563 m-high Feldberg. It also lies in the Westrich, an historic region that encompasses areas in both Germany and France.

Neighbouring municipalities
Ruschberg borders in the north on the Baumholder Troop Drilling Ground, in the east on the town of Baumholder, in the southeast on the municipality of Fohren-Linden, in the southwest on the municipality of Berglangenbach, in the west on the municipality of Heimbach and in the northwest on the municipality of Reichenbach.

Constituent communities
Also belonging to Ruschberg are the outlying homesteads of Clarashall (baryte mine), Haus Mohrenmühle, Im Inkelrech, Lauersmühle and Seibertsmühle.

Politics

Municipal council
The council is made up of 12 council members, who were elected by proportional representation at the municipal election held on 7 June 2009, and the honorary mayor as chairman.

The municipal election held on 7 June 2009 yielded the following results:

Mayor
Ruschberg's mayor is Alfred Heu.

Coat of arms
The municipality's arms might be described thus: Per fess, argent issuant from the line of partition a demilion azure armed and langued gules, and azure a hammer and pick per saltire of the first surmounted by an ear of wheat between two ears of rye all couped, palewise and Or.

Culture and sightseeing

Clubs
Catholic women's club
Eschelbacher Natur- und Angelfreunde (friends of nature and angling)
Evangelische Frauenhilfe (Evangelical women's aid)
Fußballclub 1921 (football) 
Mixed choir
Ruschberg “Germania” music club
Shooting club 
Sport club
VdK local chapter (service club)
Volunteer fire brigade

Economy and infrastructure

Public institutions
Evangelical church, parish of Baumholder
Catholic church, parish of Baumholder
Kindergarten Ruschberg
Ruschberg primary school
Ruschberg youth club
Bürgerhaus Ruschberg (community centre)

Transport
Running a few kilometres south of the municipality is the Autobahn A 62 (Kaiserslautern–Trier). Serving nearby Heimbach is a railway station on the Nahe Valley Railway (Bingen–Saarbrücken). There has been no railway station in Ruschberg itself since the 1981 when the Heimbach (Nahe)–Baumholder Railway ceased passenger operations.

References

External links
 Ruschberg in the collective municipality’s webpages 

Birkenfeld (district)